The Treacle People is a stop motion animated children's television programme shown on CITV in the United Kingdom from 3 May 1996 to 25 July 1997 and was reran on Channel 4 in the 2000s. It had two series, each with 13 episodes. In a similar vein to other shows by the same writer, the humour worked on two levels for younger and older viewers. It was produced by The London Studios for London Weekend Television (Granada Television produced the second series) and Fire Mountain Productions in association with Link Entertainment.

In 2023, the series was remastered, with full episodes uploaded on the official Treacle People YouTube Channel.

Plot
The show was written by Brian and Jonathan Trueman (the former of whom was the writer of Danger Mouse) and was based in a fictionalized version of the Northern English village of Sabden, in Pendle, where treacle is (allegedly) a natural resource extracted through mines. However, the mines have run dry from overextraction, and the village may face destruction from a lack of economy. The main characters Wizzle and Rosie use a Treacle finder, similar to a water dowser, to discover a vein of treacle in the abandoned mines, bringing hope to the village. The two series focus on reopening the mines, and problems faced (such as exportation). One of the recurring support characters was the Moobark, a cross between a Friesian cow and an Airedale Terrier.

Episodes

Season 1

Season 2

Rights
The rights to The Treacle People is now owned by Shepperton Studios-based production company, Fire Mountain Productions Limited. Fire Mountain Productions was set up by the show's producer, Iain Russell.

Awards
The Treacle People, followed up by a Christmas special, was BAFTA nominated.

Credits
 Written by: Brian and Jonathan Trueman
 Developed for television by: Mike Furness and Iain Russell
 From an original idea by: The Dewhurst Family
 Featuring the voices of: Caroline Bernstein, Alec Bregonzi, Jim McManus, Glynn Mills, Jim Norton, Willie Rushton and Brian Trueman
 Title song: Sticky
 Music by: Simon Webb
 Casting director: Nikki Finch
 Director of animation: Martin Pullen
 Animators: Mike Cottee, Timon Dowdeswell, Andy Joule and Daryl Marsh
 Production manager: Mike Fisher
 Musical co-ordinator: Rachel Williams
 Music recording: Gerry Kitchingham
 Musicians: Simon Clark, Nick Hitchins, Ben Kennard, Roddy Lorimer, Bob Loveday, Glynn Matthews, Wes McGee, Tamsin Rowlinson and Simon Webb
 Additional animation: Tobias Fouracre and Mark Waring
 Lighting cameramen: Adrian Chadlecott, John Duffy, Peter Ellmore, Colin Innes-Hopkins and Tom Kinane
 Puppets built and designed by: Richard Blakey and Maggie Haden
 Original art director: Alan Murphy
 Sets built and designed by: Jessica Ace, Colin Armitage, Toby Burrell, Barbara Cowdery and Keith Grant
 Assisted by: James Heath and Melissa Johnson
 Graphic designer: Bill Wilson
 Editors: Martin Hay, Paul Hudson, Alex Maddison, Andy Marangone, Alan Ritchie and Jeremy Scott
 Sound supervisors: Rob Ashard, Graham Hix, Jon Matthews and Russell Smithson
 Production assistant: Jo Newey
 Production associates: Kathy Schulz and Sue Bennett-Urwin
 Executive producers: Penny Lent and Danielle Lux
 Director: Mike Furness
 Producer: Iain Russell

See also
Treacle mining

References

External links
.
Official YouTube Channel.
Fire Mountain Productions Limited.
Fire Mountain Films.
London's Hollywood.

1990s British children's television series
1996 British television series debuts
1997 British television series endings
1990s British animated television series
British children's animated television shows
Fictional species and races
ITV children's television shows
London Weekend Television shows
British stop-motion animated television series
Television series by ITV Studios
English-language television shows